The 1992–93 Cincinnati Bearcats men's basketball team represented the University of Cincinnati in NCAA Division I competition in the 1991–92 season. The Bearcats, coached by Bob Huggins, won the Great Midwest Conference, and reached the Elite Eight of the 1993 NCAA tournament. The team finished with an overall record of 27–5 (8–2 GMWC).

Roster

Schedule

|-
!colspan=12 style=|Non-conference regular season

|-
!colspan=12 style=|Great Midwest Tournament 

|-
!colspan=12 style=|NCAA Tournament

Rankings

NBA draft

References

Cincinnati
Cincinnati Bearcats men's basketball seasons
Cincinnati
Cincinnati Bearcats men's basketball
Cincinnati Bearcats men's basketball